Arthur Patrick Avondale Stuart, 8th Earl Castle Stewart (born 18 August 1928), styled Viscount Stuart from 1944 to 1961, is a nobleman in the Peerage of Ireland.

The third son of Arthur Stuart, 7th Earl Castle Stewart and his wife Eleanor May Guggenheim, daughter of Solomon Guggenheim, he became his father's heir apparent after the death of his two elder brothers in World War II. He was educated at Eton College and Trinity College, Cambridge, taking a BA from the latter in 1950. He was commissioned a second lieutenant in the Scots Guards on 1 January 1949 and was promoted to lieutenant on 31 May.

In 1952, he married Edna Fowler (d. 2003), daughter of William Edward Fowler, of Harborne, a land agent and surveyor, by whom he has one son and one daughter:
Andrew Richard Charles Stuart, Viscount Stuart (b. 1953), married Annie Yvette le Poulain in 1973, divorced in 2002, and has one daughter
Lady Bridget Ann Stuart (b. 1957), married Robert William Wadey in 1990 and has one daughter

In 2004, he married Gillian Savill, Deputy Lieutenant of Tyrone.
Stuart succeeded his father in the earldom in 1961.

From 1967 to 1997, he was vice-president of the Solomon R. Guggenheim Museum, and served on the advisory board of the Peggy Guggenheim Collection as vice-president from 1980 to 2011 and president from 2011 to 2013. Castle Stewart was a trustee of The Christian Community in the UK from 1973 to 2001. He is a fellow of the Chartered Management Institute. From 2000 until 2007, he was chairman of the Foundation for International Security.

He is the senior living member of the royal Stewart family, descended in a legitimate male line from Robert II of Scotland. However, he has never made any claim to a royal throne.

References

1928 births
Living people
British people of German-Jewish descent
Alumni of Trinity College, Cambridge
Earls in the Peerage of Ireland
People educated at Eton College
Scots Guards officers
Guggenheim family